Miro Kovačić (born 29 August 1994 in Croatia) is a Croatian footballer.

References

External links
 

1994 births
Living people
Footballers from Split, Croatia
Association football midfielders
Croatian footballers
HNK Hajduk Split players
NK Solin players
1. SC Znojmo players
NK Hrvatski Dragovoljac players
HNK Zmaj Makarska players
1. FC Köln II players
NK GOŠK Gabela players
Croatian Football League players
First Football League (Croatia) players
Czech National Football League players
Regionalliga players
Premier League of Bosnia and Herzegovina players
Croatian expatriate footballers
Expatriate footballers in the Czech Republic
Croatian expatriate sportspeople in the Czech Republic
Expatriate footballers in Germany
Croatian expatriate sportspeople in Germany
Expatriate footballers in Bosnia and Herzegovina
Croatian expatriate sportspeople in Bosnia and Herzegovina